The Raleigh and Charleston Railroad was a Southeastern railroad that served eastern South Carolina and eastern North Carolina in the early 20th century.

The Raleigh and Charleston acquired the Carolina Northern Railroad in 1902 after the latter went into receivership. The line ran from Lumberton, North Carolina, to South Marion, South Carolina.

The Raleigh and Charleston Railroad Company was incorporated in 1905. In December 1911, the Seaboard Air Line acquired the company.

The Raleigh and Charleston was listed as an "abandoned" line when Seaboard underwent a reorganization in the early 1940s.

References

Defunct South Carolina railroads
Railway companies established in 1902
Railway companies disestablished in 1945